Aleksei Olegovich Kotlyarov (born 11 May 1989) is a former Russian professional footballer.

Club career
He made his professional debut in the Russian Second Division in 2007 for FC Rubin-2 Kazan. He played one game in the Russian Cup for the main FC Rubin Kazan team.

References

External links
 

1989 births
People from Magnitogorsk
Living people
Russian footballers
FC Rubin Kazan players
Russian Premier League players
FC Khimki players
FC Fakel Voronezh players
Association football midfielders
FC Neftekhimik Nizhnekamsk players
Sportspeople from Chelyabinsk Oblast